The second season of So You Think You Can Dance premiered on May 25, 2006, with new host Cat Deeley.

On August 16, Benji Schwimmer was announced as the winner of season 2 and received the grand prize of $100,000, a new hybrid SUV, and a one-year contract with Celine Dion's Las Vegas show, A New Day....  Schwimmer almost did not make the show's top 20 — he was officially first runner-up dancer in case any of the male dancers ran into unforeseen difficulties prior to the start of filming. As it happened, for the second year in a row, Hokuto Konishi was unable to get his visa cleared to work in the U.S. in time for the first taping, and he was cut.  Schwimmer took his spot in the Top 20 and fared well from the start, garnering consistent praise from the judges and votes from viewers.  Schwimmer and fellow grand finalist Donyelle Jones, who were paired as a couple from the first performance episode, became the first contestants in the show's run never to face elimination from being among the bottom six or bottom four dancers.

Auditions
Auditions were held in New York City; Los Angeles; Chicago; and Charleston, South Carolina.

Vegas week
One hundred and sixteen dancers were invited for a week of training to the Aladdin hotel (now Planet Hollywood Resort and Casino) in Las Vegas, Nevada. This training included hip-hop choreography taught by Shane Sparks, samba choreography taught by Mary Murphy with assistance from season 1 contestant Artem Chigvinsev, a contemporary routine taught by Mia Michaels, and training from Brian Friedman, who described his choreography as a fusion of jazz and hip-hop. The original group of dancers was eventually whittled down to 41, from which the judges chose their top 20.

Top 20 Contestants

Female Contestants

Male Contestants

Finals

Elimination chart
The song played after each female elimination was "Suddenly I See" by KT Tunstall, whilst that played after each male elimination was "It's the End of the Road" by Matt Goss.

Performance nights

Week 1 (June 14, 2006)

Judges: Nigel Lythgoe, Mary Murphy and Dan Karaty
Couple dances:

Week 2 (June 21, 2006)

Judges: Nigel Lythgoe, Shane Sparks and Mia Michaels

Guest dancer(s): SickStep Crew (now Quest Crew): "Canned Heat"—Jamiroquai (Breakdance)
Couple dances:

Week 3 (June 28, 2006)

Judges: Nigel Lythgoe, Mary Murphy, Olisa Thompson and Cicely Bradley

Guest dancer(s): Hop, Swing and a Jump: "Traffic Jam"—Bill Elliott (Lindy Hop)
Couple dances:

Week 4 (July 5, 2006)

Judges: Nigel Lythgoe, Mary Murphy and Dan Karaty

Guest dancer(s): Lil' C and the Neph Squad: "Spaz Meter"—The J-Squad (Krump)
Couple dances:

Week 5 (July 12, 2006)

Judges: Nigel Lythgoe, Mary Murphy and Brian Friedman
Couple dances:

Week 6 (July 19, 2006)

Judges: Nigel Lythgoe, Olisa Thompson, Cicely Bradley and Jean-Marc Généreux
Couple dances:

Solos:

Week 7 (July 26, 2006)

Judges: Nigel Lythgoe, Mary Murphy and Dan Karaty
Couple dances:

Week 8 (August 2, 2006)
Judges: Nigel Lythgoe, Mary Murphy and Mia Michaels
Couple dances:

Solos:

Week 9 (August 9, 2006)

Judges: Nigel Lythgoe, Mary Murphy and Brian Friedman
Group dance: Top 4: "SexyBack"—Justin Timberlake (Pop; Choreographer: Wade Robson)
Duo dances:

Solos:

Results shows

Week 1 (June 15, 2006)
Group dance: Top 20: "Technologic"—Daft Punk (Pop-Jazz; Choreographer: Brian Friedman)
Musical guest: "Promiscuous"—Nelly Furtado feat. Timbaland
Guest dancer(s): Nick Lazzarini: "Pardon Me"—Incubus (Contemporary)
Bottom 3 couples' solos:

Eliminated:
Erin Ellis
Stanislav Savich
New partners:
None

Week 2 (June 22, 2006)

Group dance: Top 18: "Get Up Offa That Thing"—James Brown (Funk; Choreographer: Dan Karaty)
Musical guest: "SOS"—Rihanna
Bottom 3 couples' solos:

Eliminated:
Joy Spears
Jason Williams
New partners:
Dmitry Chaplin and Aleksandra Wojda

Week 3 (June 29, 2006)

Group dance: Top 16: "Poison"—Bell Biv DeVoe (Hip-Hop; Choreographer: Shane Sparks)
Musical guest: "Single"—Natasha Bedingfield
Bottom 3 couples' solos:

Eliminated:
Aleksandra Wojda
Ben Susak
New partners:
Dmitry Chaplin and Ashlee Nino

Week 4 (July 6, 2006)
Group dance: Top 14: "Footloose" from Footloose (Jive; Choreographer: Mary Murphy)
Musical guest: "Sexy Love"—Ne-Yo
Bottom 3 couples' solos:

Eliminated:
Jessica Fernandez
Jaymz Tuaileva
New partners:
None

Week 5 (July 13, 2006)

Group dance: Top 12: "Born to be Alive"—Patrick Hernandez (Disco; Choreographer: Doriana Sanchez)
Musical guest: "Buttons"—The Pussycat Dolls
Bottom 3 couples' solos:

Eliminated:
Ashlee Nino
Musa Cooper
New Partners:
None : now that it was down to the top 10, partners were randomly picked and viewers got to vote on individual dancers.

Week 6 (July 20, 2006)
Note: This week, the dancers performed the same solo twice
Group dance: Top 10: "Ramalama (Bang Bang)"—Róisín Murphy (Pop-Jazz; Choreographer: Wade Robson)
Musical guest: "Gimme That"—Chris Brown
Bottom 4 dancers:
Dmitry Chaplin
Natalie Fotopoulos
Martha Nichols
Ryan Rankine
Eliminated:
Martha Nichols
Dmitry Chaplin

Week 7 (July 27, 2006)

Group dance: Top 8: "Cell Block Tango" from Chicago (musical) (Broadway; Choreographer: Tyce Diorio)
Musical guest: A medley of "Touch It", "I Love My Chick", and "In the Ghetto"—Busta Rhymes
Bottom 4 dancers' solos:

Eliminated:
Allison Holker
Ryan Rankine

Week 8 (August 3, 2006)

Group dance: "Hide and Seek"—Imogen Heap (Contemporary; Choreographer: Mia Michaels)
Musical Guest: "Entourage"—Omarion
Solos:
Natalie Fotopoulos: "I Would Die for You"—Jann Arden
Heidi Groskreutz: "Hey Mama"—The Black Eyed Peas
Donyelle Jones: "Buttons"—The Pussycat Dolls
Travis Wall: "Flying Without Wings (A Capella version)"—Westlife
Ivan Koumaev: "I Question Mark"—Wade Robson
Benji Schwimmer:  "Brown Derby Jump"—Cherry Poppin' Daddies
Eliminated:
Natalie Fotopoulos
Ivan Koumaev

Week 10 (Finale) (August 16, 2006)

Judges: Nigel Lythgoe, Mary Murphy, Brian Friedman, Shane Sparks, Mia Michaels, Dan Karaty
Musical guests:
"Get Up"—Ciara
"London Bridge"—Fergie
Special guest: Celine Dion, who appeared via videotape to congratulate the winner
Group dances:
 Top 20
"When You Gonna Give It Up To Me"—Sean Paul (ft. Keyshia Cole) (Choreographer: Shane Sparks)
"Ramalama (Bang Bang)"—Róisín Murphy (Choreographer: Wade Robson)
 Top 10
"Cell Block Tango" from Chicago (Choreographer: Tyce Diorio)
Dancers' choice: (each of the final four chose to reprise their favorite routine)
Benji Schwimmer: Mambo with Heidi Groskreutz ("Black Mambo"—Angel and the Mambokats)
Heidi Groskreutz: Contemporary with Travis Wall ("Calling You"—Celine Dion)
Donyelle Jones: Broadway with Benji Schwimmer ("You Can't Stop the Beat" from Hairspray)
Travis Wall: Paso doble with Heidi Groskreutz ("The Plaza of Execution" from The Mask of Zorro)
Judges' choice: (four of the judges picked their favorite routine)
Mary Murphy: Samba with Dmitry Chaplin and Natalie Fotopoulos ("Magalenha"—Sérgio Mendes)
Mia Michaels: Contemporary with Allison Holker and Ivan Koumaev ("Why"—Annie Lennox)
Brian Friedman: Broadway with Travis Wall and Martha Nichols ("Steam Heat"—The Pointer Sisters)
Dan Karaty: Hip-hop with Travis Wall and Benji Schwimmer ("Gyrate"—Da Muzicianz (ft. Mr. Collipark))
Solos:
Heidi Groskreutz: "I Love Rock 'n' Roll"—Joan Jett
Donyelle Jones: "I'm Free"—Amber
Benji Schwimmer: "Never Knew"—The Rocket Summer
Travis Wall: "Wonderful"—Annie Lennox
4th Place
Heidi Groskreutz
3rd Place
Donyelle Jones
Runner-Up:
Travis Wall
Winner:
Benji Schwimmer

Live tour
In 2006, the top 10 contestants went on a performance tour (which is the first sytycd tour). Tickets went on sale August 12

Awards

2007 Emmy Awards

† Wade Robson and Mia Michaels were joint-winners along with Rob Marshall and John Deluca from Tony Bennett: An American Classic.

Ratings

U.S. Nielsen ratings

See also
 List of So You Think You Can Dance finalists

Notes

References

External links
 Season 2 show synopses at tvgasm.com
 Fox.com bios and video clips
 

2006 American television seasons
Season 02

tr:So You Think You Can Dance